Castleford is a city in Twin Falls County, Idaho, United States. The population was 226 at the 2010 census. It is part of the Twin Falls, Idaho Micropolitan Statistical Area.

History

Castleford was named for an early crossing of Salmon Falls Creek. The ford was so named because of the odd-shaped obelisks of rhyolite near the stream. The ford, used by pioneers in 1849, was also used by the Kelton-Dalles stage route.

In 1890, Cephas Lilly settled the area that would later become Castleford. He was considered to be an honest, hardworking pioneer by his contemporaries.

Ferguson Fruit and Land was quick to utilize the fertile farmland, planting acres of apple orchards. The new fruit business revitalized the local economy, bringing in many new settlers. This new influx of settlers led to the official founding of Castleford in 1907. Business there continued to remain prosperous until the Great Depression, at which point Ferguson Fruit and Land became bankrupt and the town was almost abandoned. Later, with the onset of World War II, the government established a Japanese internment camp on the outskirts of the town. ( This is not a true statement.  The internment camp was actually in Hunt, Idaho. There were two Japanese families that lived in Castleford during WWII, they were told to go to the camp, but the Castleford community voiced their objections to the government, and the families were allowed to stay in Castleford.)(I agree with Mr. McCoy. I have asked my Father, David Chandler Davis and my 97-year-old grandmother, Julia Chandler and they have verified that there was no Internment Camp in Castleford) Despite their initial protest, the local citizens eventually came to welcome the government's presence, as it brought life back into their near-dead economy. After World War II, the camp was dismantled and removed in order to wipe away the stain left on Castleford's history.

During the Cold War, the United States Army conducted subterranean high-explosive tests at the Idaho Firing Range, thirty miles west of Castleford. It is locally believed that the residue from these explosives seeped into the area's water supply, which later created the town's record-breaking arsenic levels.

Nevertheless, Castleford, as a rural community, prides itself through its school district as one of the best 1A schools in Southern Idaho.

Geography
Castleford is located at  (42.520254, -114.872040), on the west bank of Salmon Falls Creek.

Climate
According to the Köppen Climate Classification system, Castleford has a semi-arid climate, abbreviated "BSk" on climate maps.

Demographics

2010 census
As of the census of 2010, there were 226 people, 90 households, and 48 families residing in the city. The racial makeup of the city was 87.6% White, 0.4% Asian, 8.8% from other races, and 3.1% from two or more races. Hispanic or Latino of any race were 35.0% of the population.

There were 90 households, of which 31.1% had children under the age of 18 living with them, 41.1% were married couples living together, 6.7% had a female householder with no husband present, 5.6% had a male householder with no wife present, and 46.7% were non-families. 37.8% of all households were made up of individuals, and 14.5% had someone living alone who was 65 years of age or older. The average household size was 2.51 and the average family size was 3.56.

The median age in the city was 33.7 years. 26.1% of residents were under the age of 18; 12.8% were between the ages of 18 and 24; 27% were from 25 to 44; 21.7% were from 45 to 64; and 12.4% were 65 years of age or older. The gender makeup of the city was 50.4% male and 49.6% female.

2000 census
As of the census of 2000, there were 277 people, 95 households, and 62 families residing in the city. The racial makeup of the city was 80.14% White, 0.36% African American, 1.08% Native American, 0.36% Pacific Islander, 14.08% from other races, and 3.97% from two or more races. Hispanic or Latino of any race were 38.27% of the population.

There were 95 households, out of which 40.0% had children under the age of 18 living with them, 49.5% were married couples living together, 13.7% had a female householder with no husband present, and 33.7% were non-families. 27.4% of all households were made up of individuals, and 13.7% had someone living alone who was 65 years of age or older.  The average household size was 2.92 and the average family size was 3.60.

In the city, the population was spread out, with 37.9% under the age of 18, 7.6% from 18 to 24, 23.8% from 25 to 44, 19.9% from 45 to 64, and 10.8% who were 65 years of age or older.  The median age was 28 years. For every 100 females, there were 83.4 males.  For every 100 females age 18 and over, there were 77.3 males.

The median income for a household in the city was $22,083, and the median income for a family was $26,250. Males had a median income of $22,679 versus $16,875 for females. The per capita income for the city was $9,046.  About 32.7% of families and 35.1% of the population were below the poverty line, including 48.8% of those under the age of eighteen and 38.2% of those 65 or over.

See also

 List of cities in Idaho

References

External links

Cities in Idaho
Cities in Twin Falls County, Idaho
Twin Falls, Idaho metropolitan area